Hydrodeoxygenation (HDO) is a hydrogenolysis process for removing oxygen from oxygen-containing compounds.  Typical HDO catalysts commonly are sulfided nickel-molybdenum or cobalt-molybdenum on gamma alumina.  An idealized reaction is:
R2O + 2 H2 -> H2O + 2 RH
The first review on HDO was published in 1983. HDO is of interest in producing biofuels, which are derived from oxygen-rich precursors like sugars or lipids. An example of a biomass refining process employing hydrodeoxygenation is the NEXBTL process.

HDO of biomass fast pyrolysis vapors under low hydrogen pressures have recently attracted a lot of attention. Bulk molybdenum trioxide (MoO3) was used as catalyst and found to completely deoxygenate cellulose, corn stover, and lignin pyrolysis vapors and produce a stream of hydrocarbons including aromatics, alkenes, and alkanes. From an economic viewpoint, only aromatics and alkenes should ideally be produced to enable product incorporation into the existing infrastructure.

References

Chemical processes
Petroleum technology